The 1868 United States presidential election in Michigan took place on November 3, 1868, as part of the 1868 United States presidential election. Voters chose eight electors to the Electoral College, which selected the president and vice president.

Michigan was won by Republican nominee General Ulysses S. Grant over Democratic candidate Governor Horatio Seymour by a margin of almost 14%.

Results

See also
 United States presidential elections in Michigan

References

Michigan
1868
1868 Michigan elections